Markinsenis Peak is a peak,  high, on the south side of McCann Glacier at its junction with Lillie Glacier, in the Bowers Mountains of Antarctica. It was mapped by the United States Geological Survey from surveys and U.S. Navy air photos, 1960–64, and was named by the Advisory Committee on Antarctic Names for radioman Ronald Markinsenis, U.S. Navy, of the South Pole Station winter party, 1965.

References

Mountains of Victoria Land
Pennell Coast